Tower of Lust is a 1955 French / Italian drama film directed by Abel Gance.

Cast 
 Pierre Brasseur - Jehan Buridan
 Silvana Pampanini - Marguerite de Bourgogne
 Paul Guers - Gaultier d'Aulnay
 Jacques Toja - Philippe d'Aulnay
  - Orsini
 Constant Rémy - Landry
 Lia Di Leo - Princesse Blanche
 Cristina Grado - Princesse Jeanne
 Jacques Mafioli 
 Rivers Cadet - Le tavernier

References

External links 

1955 drama films
1955 films
French drama films
Italian drama films
Films directed by Abel Gance
Films based on works by Alexandre Dumas
Films set in the 14th century
1950s French-language films
1950s Italian films
1950s French films